Henry Badowski (born October 1958) is a British multi-instrumentalist, songwriter, and composer, who was a member of several punk rock bands in the 1970s before embarking on a solo career.

Career
Badowski's apprenticeship started in  several UK bands including Norman Hounds and the Baskervilles, Lick It Dry and the New Rockets. Badowski joined his friend, guitarist James Stevenson, in Gene October's Chelsea as bassist in March 1977 despite having "barely picked up a bass guitar in [his] life". He then moved on to play Vox Continental organ in Wreckless Eric's band, before forming the band King as vocalist and keyboard player along with Captain Sensible, who described Badowski as "a genius". Badowski was invited by Sensible to join a short-lived incarnation of The Damned to replace Lemmy, at which time they went by the name The Doomed. He then drummed for Mark Perry's post-Alternative TV band The Good Missionaries, playing on the Fire From Heaven album in 1979, and also got some studio time to work on his first solo release, the "Baby Sign Here With Me/Making Love With My Wife" single, released by Deptford Fun City Records, one of Miles Copeland III's labels, and packaged in a gold foil sleeve. He also served as drummer with the Good Missionaries, an experimental band created by Mark Perry from Alternative TV.

Badowski's solo career began  in the summer of 1979, with the release of "Making Love With My Wife" on Deptford Fun City label. Recorded at Pathway Studios, the track was performed completely by Badowski and displayed a strong 1960s influence, with airs of Syd Barrett and Kevin Ayers. The B-side "Baby Sign Here With Me", utilized the talents of James Stevenson (bass/guitar) from Chelsea, Alex Kolkowski (violin) and Dave Berk (drums), both from the Johnny Moped Band. He signed to A&M Records/I.R.S. Records for subsequent solo releases, including the album Life is a Grand..., from which the singles "My Face" and "Henry's in Love" were drawn. Badowski played most of the instruments on the album himself, but with contributions from Stevenson, violinist Aleksander Kolkowski, and drummer Dave Berk (of Johnny Moped). Although the album met with a favourable response from critics, it proved to be his final solo release.

Solo discography

Albums
 Life is a Grand... (1981), A&M

Singles
 "Making Love With My Wife"/"Baby Sign Here With Me" (1979), Deptford Fun City
 "Baby Sign Here With Me"/"Making Love With My Wife" (1979), A&M
 "My Face"/"Four More Seasons" (1980), A&M
 "My Face"/"Making Love With My Wife" (1980), IRS
 "Henry's in Love"/"Lamb to the Slaughter" (1981), A&M

References

External links
Official website

English keyboardists
English songwriters
Living people
1958 births
The Damned (band) members